Ville Salmikivi (born 20 May 1992) is a Finnish footballer who plays as a forward for Finnish Ykkönen club PK-35.

Career

Youth career
Salmikivi begun playing football being five years old in HIFK. The youth organisation of HIFK was acquired by PK-35 in 2000, thus he played in PK-35 until the season 2010. He was selected as "The Boy Player of the Year" of the club in 2008.

Viikingit
Salmikivi didn't manage to break through to the first team of PK-35, therefore he moved to FC Viikingit for the season of 2011. In Viikingit he was the top goalscorer of the season 2011 in Ykkönen, scoring 20 goals. The accomplishment earned himself to be "The Footballer of the Season 2011 in Ykkönen", voted by the Federation of Finnish Footballers. During the season 2012, he scored seven times.

MyPa
For the season 2013, he transferred to MyPa. He made his league debut on 14 May 2013 in the opening match against KuPS. He continued to play for MyPa in 2014.

HIFK
For the season 2015, he made a contract with HIFK.

Beroe
On 3 February 2017 Salmikivi joined Beroe Stara Zagora of the Bulgarian First League. He made his debut in the league on February 17, scoring one goal for the 4-0 thrashing over Dunav Ruse at home. He left Beroe on 9 June 2017.

Olimpia Grudziądz
On 13 July 2017, Salmikivi signed with I liga side Olimpia Grudziądz.

References

1992 births
Footballers from Helsinki
Living people
Finnish footballers
Association football forwards
Veikkausliiga players
PK-35 Vantaa (men) players
FC Viikingit players
Myllykosken Pallo −47 players
Sudet players
HIFK Fotboll players
PFC Beroe Stara Zagora players
Olimpia Grudziądz players
GKS Jastrzębie players
FC Lahti players
Ykkönen players
First Professional Football League (Bulgaria) players
I liga players
II liga players
Kakkonen players
Finnish expatriate footballers
Finnish expatriate sportspeople in Bulgaria
Expatriate footballers in Bulgaria
Finnish expatriate sportspeople in Poland
Expatriate footballers in Poland